Walnut Township is one of the fifteen townships of Pickaway County, Ohio, United States.  The 2000 census found 2,428 people in the township.

Geography
Located in the northeastern part of the county, it borders the following townships:
Madison Township - north
Bloom Township, Fairfield County - northeast corner
Amanda Township, Fairfield County - east
Washington Township - south
Circleville Township - southwest
Jackson Township - west
Harrison Township - northwest

No municipalities are located in Walnut Township.

Stage's Pond State Nature Preserve, a 178-acre nature preserve with ponds, is located in Walnut Township.

Name and history
Statewide, other Walnut Townships are located in Fairfield and Gallia Counties.

Government
The township is governed by a three-member board of trustees, who are elected in November of odd-numbered years to a four-year term beginning on the following January 1. Two are elected in the year after the presidential election and one is elected in the year before it. There is also an elected township fiscal officer, who serves a four-year term beginning on April 1 of the year after the election, which is held in November of the year before the presidential election. Vacancies in the fiscal officership or on the board of trustees are filled by the remaining trustees.

References

External links
County website

Townships in Pickaway County, Ohio
Townships in Ohio